The 2013 St. Louis mayoral election was held on April 2, 2013 to elect the mayor of St. Louis, Missouri. It saw the reelection of incumbent mayor Francis Slay to a fourth term.

The election was preceded by party primaries on March 5.

Democratic primary 
Incumbent mayor Francis Slay was challenged for renomination by St. Louis City Board of Aldermen President Lewis E. Reed, as well as by Jimmie Matthews.

Green primary

Results

Results

References

Mayoral elections in St. Louis
St. Louis
St. Louis
2010s in St. Louis
St. Louis